Carolina Losada (born 16 December 1972) is an Argentine politician, television presenter and journalist.

Personal life 
She is engaged to fellow senator Luis Petcoff Naidenoff.

See also 

 List of Argentine senators, 2021–2023

References 

1972 births
Living people
Argentine television journalists
Argentine television presenters
Argentine women television presenters
People from Rosario, Santa Fe
21st-century Argentine politicians
21st-century Argentine women politicians
Women members of the Argentine Senate
Members of the Argentine Senate for Santa Fe
Radical Civic Union politicians